This is a list of active and extinct volcanoes in Japan.  An Orange background indicates a volcano considered active by the Japan Meteorological Agency.

Hokkaido

Honshū

Izu Islands

Ogasawara Archipelago 
The Ogasawara Archipelago include the Bonin Islands and Volcano Islands.

Kyūshū

Ryūkyū Islands

See also

Notes and references

Notes

References

External links
 Quaternary Volcanoes of Japan - Geological Survey of Japan
 Volcano on Google Map - Geological Survey of Japan
 The National Catalogue of the Active Volcanoes in Japan - Japan Meteorological Agency
 日本の主な山岳標高 (Elevation of Principal Mountains in Japan) - Geospatial Information Authority of Japan 

Japan
 
Lists of coordinates
Volcanoes